During the 1897–98 season Hibernian, a football club based in Edinburgh, finished third out of 10 clubs in the Scottish First Division.

Scottish First Division

Final League table

Scottish Cup

See also
List of Hibernian F.C. seasons

References

External links
Hibernian 1897/1898 results and fixtures, Soccerbase

Hibernian F.C. seasons
Hibernian